Wander Suero Montero (born September 15, 1991) is a Dominican professional baseball pitcher in the Los Angeles Dodgers organization. He previously played in Major League Baseball (MLB) for the Washington Nationals. He made his MLB debut in 2018 and won the 2019 World Series with the Nationals.

Professional career

Minor leagues

2010–2015
The Washington Nationals signed Suero as a non-drafted free agent in May 2010. He spent three seasons in Washington's player development system in the Dominican Republic, pitching for the Dominican Summer League Nationals from 2010 through 2012. In 2010, he started four games and appeared in relief 11 times, finishing the season with a record of 2–3, an earned run average (ERA) of 4.72, and 39 strikeouts and 23 walks in 34 innings. In 2011, he posted a record of 3–2 and an ERA of 5.49 with 41 strikeouts and 26 walks, pitching 39 innings in two starts and 14 relief appearances, while in 2012 he appeared in nine games, starting eight of them, and pitched 37 innings, with a record of 4–2 and an ERA of 3.41, striking out 34 batters and walking 12.

Suero moved up to the Rookie-level Gulf Coast League, playing for the Gulf Coast League Nationals, then based at the Nationals' spring training home at Space Coast Stadium in Viera, Florida, in 2013. That season, the Gulf Coast League Nationals finished their regular season with a record of 49–9, and their .845 winning percentage was the highest winning percentage for a full regular season ever achieved by a minor-league baseball team based in the United States. The Nationals then won all three of their playoff games, defeating the Gulf Coast League Pirates in a single-game semifinal playoff and sweeping the Gulf Coast League Red Sox in the best-of-three league championship series, to become the 2013 Gulf Coast League champions. During the championship season, Suero appeared in 13 games, starting three of them, and posted an 8–1 record, with an ERA of 1.65, 46 strikeouts, and 13 walks in 49 innings of work.

Suero was promoted to the Class A Advanced Potomac Nationals in the Carolina League to begin the 2014 season and struck out 21 batters, but walked 10 and pitched to an ERA of 7.57 in 27 innings of relief. Demoted to the Class A Hagerstown Suns in the South Atlantic League, he finished the season there, pitching 72 innings, striking out 62 batters, walking only 11, and posting an ERA of 2.13 in six starts and 11 relief appearances, giving him an overall ERA of 3.62 for the year with 83 strikeouts and 21 walks. Promoted to the Class AA Harrisburg Senators of the Eastern League to begin the 2015 season, he again struggled, striking out 29 but walking 14, with a 6.35 ERA over 34 innings of relief in his first taste of the high minor leagues. Demoted to Potomac, he pitched 56 innings there in five starts and 11 relief appearances with 39 strikeouts, 18 walks, and an ERA of 2.41, and his ERA for the 2015 season as a whole was 3.90 with an overall total of 68 strikeouts and 32 walks.

During the 2015–16 offseason, Suero played in the Dominican Winter League, making two relief appearances for the Tigres del Licey. He pitched 1 innings and had an ERA of 5.40 with a strikeout and no walks.

2016–2017
Suero was a non-roster invitee to major league spring training before the 2016 season. He spent the entire 2016 season with Class AA Harrisburg, his performance much improved from his time there the previous year; he posted a 2.44 ERA on the season, pitching 55 innings in 39 relief appearances with 48 strikeouts and 21 walks. He pitched for Tigres del Licey in the Dominican Winter League again during the 2016-2017 offseason, and his performance improved there as well: In 13 relief appearances, he pitched 14 scoreless innings, with 10 strikeouts and only four walks.

He was again invited to major league spring training as a non-roster pitcher before the 2017 season. Returning to Harrisburg as the 2017 season began, Suero had a 1.96 ERA and 10 saves in 23 innings of relief, and he quickly earned a promotion to the Class AAA Syracuse Chiefs of the International League for the first time on June 2, 2017. He collected his first Triple-A save on June 14, 2017, against the Pawtucket Red Sox. The Washington Post described Suero among the bright spots of an 87-loss season for the Chiefs in 2017, as he put up a 1.70 ERA across 36 games with the Chiefs after his promotion. The Nationals awarded Suero as their Minor League Pitcher of the Year. He told a Mid-Atlantic Sports Network reporter that his goal was to work hard over the winter to prove to the organization his readiness to pitch in the major leagues.

The Nationals added Suero to their 40-man roster after the 2017 season. His addition protected him in advance of the Rule 5 draft that December. It also placed him in contention for a spot on the Nationals' major league roster in the 2018 season. He pitched for Tigres del Licey in the Dominican Winter League again during the 2017-2018 offseason, but with less success, with five strikeouts, six walks, and an ERA of 7.56 in 8 innings of work over nine relief appearances.

Major leagues

2018

Suero began spring training in 2018 by pitching four scoreless innings with seven strikeouts and no walks, but he suffered an oblique strain during a Grapefruit League game on March 9. He was shut down for three weeks before he resumed throwing at the Nationals′ spring training complex at FITTEAM Ballpark of the Palm Beaches in West Palm Beach, Florida, and he did not make his debut with Syracuse until April 21, issuing no walks but allowing three runs on five hits in one inning of work. He improved rapidly after that: In his next three appearances with the Chiefs, he pitched a combined three innings, giving up no runs or walks, dropping his ERA for the season from 27.00 after his first appearance to 6.75.

On April 30, the Nationals called Suero up to the major leagues for the first time to reinforce Washington's bullpen with middle-relief strength. He had played in 212 minor-league games over eight seasons before his first major-league call-up. He made his major-league debut on May 1 in a game against the Pittsburgh Pirates at Nationals Park in Washington, D.C., entering the game in relief of starter Max Scherzer with one out in the seventh inning and Washington leading 12–2. He threw 15 pitches and gave up two singles to the first two batters he faced, third baseman Colin Moran and shortstop Jordy Mercer, but then got second baseman Max Moroff to pop out to the shortstop and right fielder Adam Frazier to fly out to center field to complete both the inning and his first major league appearance without surrendering any runs. He notched his first major-league strikeout in his second major-league appearance on May 4, fanning pinch-hitter Jesmuel Valentín as part of a 1-inning performance in which he did not allow a base runner during a 7–3 Nationals victory over the Philadelphia Phillies. Suero had appeared in 12 games for Washington, posting an ERA of 4.15 with 11 strikeouts and five walks in 13 innings of work, when the Nationals optioned him to Syracuse on June 9, but they recalled him to the major leagues on June 10.

On the afternoon of June 18, 2018, the Nationals resumed a game at Nationals Park against the New York Yankees that had been suspended due to rain on May 15 after  innings with the score tied 3–3. Suero pitched the top of the sixth inning on May 15 and thus was the pitcher of record when, in the bottom of the sixth on June 18, the Nationals took the lead for good on a two-run homer by Juan Soto. He also pitched the first third of an inning in the top of the seventh, giving up a hit and striking out two in  innings of work spread across five weeks, and he came away from the game with his first major-league decision, a win retroactively credited to him as of May 15. Suero also appeared in a full game against the Yankees on the evening of June 18—a makeup game for a rainout on May 16—pitching an inning and walking a batter who later scored. He had pitched  innings in 15 major-league appearances on the season, posting a 3.63 ERA, striking out 16, and walking six, when the Nationals optioned him to Syracuse on June 19 to make room on their roster for newly acquired reliever Kelvin Herrera.

2019
Suero was Washington's most used reliever during the 2019 season; he led the team in games pitched and relief innings. He recorded his first Major League save on June 21, 2019 at Nationals Park. Suero was left off Washington's roster to start the 2019 National League Championship Series, placed on the roster when Daniel Hudson went on paternity leave and then removed again when Hudson returned. Suero appeared in the 2019 World Series in three different games and retired all five batters he faced. He was the only pitcher to appear in the series and not allow any baserunners.

2020
In the pandemic-shortened 2020 season, Suero posted a 2–0 record with a 3.80 ERA while recording 28 strikeouts in  innings over 22 games.

On November 30, 2021, Suero was non-tendered by the Nationals, making him a free agent.

Los Angeles Angels
On March 31, 2022, Suero signed a minor league contract with the Los Angeles Angels. He was released on July 8, 2022.

Sultanes de Monterrey
On July 14, 2022, Suero signed with the Sultanes de Monterrey of the Mexican League. He appeared in 7 games for Monterrey, recording a 1-1 record and 2.84 ERA with 8 strikeouts in 6.1 innings pitched. Suero was released by the team on January 11, 2023.

Los Angeles Dodgers
On January 23, 2023, Suero signed a minor league contract with the Los Angeles Dodgers.

References

External links

1991 births
Dominican Summer League Nationals players
Dominican Republic expatriate baseball players in Mexico
Dominican Republic expatriate baseball players in the United States
Gulf Coast Nationals players
Hagerstown Suns players
Harrisburg Senators players

Living people
Major League Baseball pitchers
Major League Baseball players from the Dominican Republic
People from San José de Ocoa Province
Potomac Nationals players
Rochester Red Wings players
Salt Lake Bees players
Sultanes de Monterrey players
Syracuse Chiefs players
Tigres del Licey players
Washington Nationals players